The 1921 Hessian state election was held on 27 November 1921 to elect the 70 members of the Landtag of Hesse.

Results

References

Hesse
Elections in Hesse